An African Election is a 2011 documentary film about the contentious 2008 general elections in Ghana, directed by Jarreth and Kevin Merz.  The film features interviews with the two major presidential candidates, Nana Akufo-Addo and John Atta Mills, as well as Ghana's former president Jerry Rawlings.

External links

2011 documentary films
2011 films
American documentary films
Documentary films about African politics
Documentary films about elections
Ghanaian documentary films
Swiss documentary films
Best Documentary Africa Movie Academy Award winners
Elections in Africa
2010s English-language films
2010s American films